George Mitchell Cathie (26 October 1905 – 29 April 1967) was an Australian rules footballer who played with Hawthorn in the Victorian Football League (VFL).

Notes

External links 

1905 births
1967 deaths
Australian rules footballers from Melbourne
Hawthorn Football Club players
Collegians Football Club players
People from Hawthorn, Victoria